A list of films produced in Italy in 1977 (see 1977 in film):

References

Footnotes

Sources

External links
Italian films of 1977 at the Internet Movie Database

1977
Films
Lists of 1977 films by country or language